Stanislav Albertovich Magkeyev (born 27 March 1999) is a Russian football player of Ossetian descent who plays as a defensive midfielder or centre-back for FC Lokomotiv Moscow.

Club career
He made his debut in the Russian Professional Football League for FC Kazanka Moscow on 18 July 2018 in a game against FC Leningradets Leningrad Oblast.

He made his Russian Premier League debut for FC Lokomotiv Moscow on 26 May 2019 in a game against FC Ufa as a 90th-minute substitute for Fyodor Smolov. He made his first start on 18 October 2019 in a game against FC Akhmat Grozny.

International career
He was called up to the Russia national football team for the first time for World Cup qualifiers against Croatia, Cyprus and Malta in September 2021.

Honours

Club
Lokomotiv Moscow
Russian Cup: 2020–21

Career statistics

References

External links
 
 

1999 births
Sportspeople from Vladikavkaz
Living people
Russian footballers
Russia under-21 international footballers
Association football midfielders
Association football defenders
FC Lokomotiv Moscow players
Russian Premier League players
Russian Second League players